Bakhshapur railway station is located in District kashmore, Sindh Pakistan.

See also
 List of railway stations in Pakistan
 Pakistan Railways

References

Railway stations on Kotri–Attock Railway Line (ML 2)